Begumganj Government Pilot High School is a secondary school with EIIN 107191 located in the Chowmuhani town of Begumganj Upazila, Noakhali District, Bangladesh. The school offers education for students ranging from sixth grade to tenth grade.

History
In 1815, the school started its journey as a minor school on the bank of the famous Alipur pond. The British Colonial found it with a purpose of an initial step to enlighten education in Begumganj Upazila. In 1857, the school was shifted to its current location, north side of Begumganj bridge as a secondary school. On 31 December 1987, the school gained the honor of government and have been running as a government high school since 1988.

Facilities
At present, it has 3 large buildings, one large side-walled hall room and 2 residential hostels only for the teachers and school stuffs. There is a big field in the school arena. The school has got a mosque and two big ponds as well. There are about 30 teachers and other facilities including an auditorium, a library, three laboratories and a computer room. The authority also organizes morning assembly, annual sports function, annual prize giving ceremony, many religious festivals and different cultural programmes.

Admission
Usually students are admitted in the sixth grade. Admission can be considered in other classes if a vacancy is available or if someone is transferred from some other government school. Students who want to get admitted in this school must be passed in the previous grade and have to go through an entrance examination. The examination is usually taken in the first week of January.

Sections
From the very beginning, the school is continuing the classes with a single shift. However, all the grades from 6th to 8th has two sections. The 9th and 10th grade students are offered 3 different sections Science, Commerce and Arts that can be chosen by their own.

Uniform
The uniform is a white shirt with white full pant and white shoes and black belt. The school monogram have to be contained on the pocket of the white shirt.

References

Begumganj Upazila
High schools in Bangladesh
Schools in Noakhali District